Champex Pass (French: "Col de Champex") (el. 1470 m.) is a high mountain pass in the Alps in the canton of Valais in Switzerland.

It is near the village of Champex-Lac.

See also
 List of highest paved roads in Europe
 List of mountain passes

References

Mountain passes of Valais
Mountain passes of the Alps